The 2022 Valencian Community motorcycle Grand Prix (officially known as the Gran Premio Motul de la Comunitat Valenciana) was the twentieth and final round of the 2022 Grand Prix motorcycle racing season. It was held at the Circuit Ricardo Tormo in Valencia on 6 November 2022. The MotoGP riders' championship was decided in this race between Fabio Quartararo and Francesco Bagnaia. Bagnaia secured his first MotoGP riders' title after finishing in ninth, as Quartararo's fourth-place-finish was eventually not enough to successfully defend his title.

In the Moto2 class, Augusto Fernández claimed the riders' title by finishing in second behind Pedro Acosta, whilst his closest championship rival Ai Ogura retired after an accident. This was also the final Grand Prix in Moto2 for Simone Corsi and Marcel Schrötter.

Background

Riders' entries
In MotoGP, Takaaki Nakagami returned to racing after missing several races due to injury recovery. In the Moto2 class, Barry Baltus missed the race after suffering a foot injury, RW Racing GP replaced him with Mattia Pasini. Senna Agius replacing Sam Lowes for Marc VDS Team. The Spanish rider Álex Escrig runs as a wildcard for the Forward Racing. In the Moto3 class, the Italian junior rider Filippo Farioli who made his debut as a wildcard for GasGas Aspar Team, together with David Almansa races as a wildcard for Finetwork Team Boé Motorsports. David Salvador replaces Stefano Nepa from Angeluss MTA Team who was absent due to injury.

Free practice session

MotoGP

Combinated Free Practice 1-2-3 
The top ten riders (written in bold) qualified in Q2.

Free Practice 4 

 

 Raúl Fernández suffered a crash during practice and was taken to the medical center for examination.

Moto2

Combinated Free Practice 1-2-3
The top fourteen riders (written in bold) qualified in Q2.

Moto3

Combinated Free Practice 1-2-3

The top fourteen riders (written in bold) qualified in Q2.

Qualifying

MotoGP

Moto2

Moto3

Warm up practice

MotoGP
Johann Zarco set the best time and was the fastest rider at this session ahead of Marc Márquez and Jack Miller.

Moto2 

Pedro Acosta finished at the top of the standings at this session, a head of Alonso López and Arón Canet.

Moto3

The first places in the ranking are occupied by Deniz Öncü at this session with a time of 1:39.553, followed by Diogo Moreira in second and Izan Guevara in third.

Race results

MotoGP

Moto2

Moto3

Championship standings after the race
Below are the standings for the top five riders, constructors, and teams after the round.

MotoGP

Riders' Championship standings

Constructors' Championship standings

Teams' Championship standings

Moto2

Riders' Championship standings

Constructors' Championship standings

Teams' Championship standings

Moto3

Riders' Championship standings

Constructors' Championship standings

Teams' Championship standings

References

External links

2022 MotoGP race reports
2022 in Spanish motorsport
2022
November 2022 sports events in Spain
2022 Valencian Community motorcycle Grand Prix